Breeze is a rapper from Los Angeles who released at least one album, titled T.Y.S.O.N. (The Young Son of No One) in 1989. The album featured production by the L.A. Posse, a Hip-Hop production team that produced for LL Cool J and Whodini, amongst others. His notability was substantiated by his inclusion on the west coast remix of "Where are They Now", a song presented by Nas where notable artists from the earlier history of Hip-Hop were featured as a sort of tribute to their contribution to the music genre.

Discography
Studio Albums
T.Y.S.O.N. (1989, Atlantic Records)

Extended Plays
It Ain't Funky No More/Black Owned/Bad Press (1992, Hollywood & Vine Records)

Singles
L.A. Posse (1989, Atlantic Records)
Great Big Freak (1989, Atlantic Records)

Guest Appearances
Just Clowing (King Tee, Act a Fool (album)) (1988, Capitol)
Played Like A Piano (King Tee, At Your Own Risk (album)) (1990, Capitol)
Freestyle Ghetto (King Tee, IV Life (album)) (1994, MCA Records)
Where Are They Now (West Coast remix) (Nas, 2008)

References

African-American male rappers
American male rappers
Rappers from Los Angeles
Living people
21st-century American rappers
21st-century American male musicians
Year of birth missing (living people)
21st-century African-American musicians